James Joseph Crabtree  (15 February 1895 – 4 December 1965) was an English professional footballer who played as a goalkeeper in the Football League for Rochdale, Blackburn Rovers and Accrington Stanley. He was capped by England at amateur level and played one Football League match as an inside forward for Rochdale, for whom he scored two goals. Crabtree later served as a linesman in the Football League and as a referee in the Lancashire Combination.

Personal life 
Crabtree attended Stonyhurst College. On 5 September 1914, a matter of days after the outbreak of the First World War, Crabtree enlisted as a private in the Loyal North Lancashire Regiment. Just over a year later, he was commissioned as a second lieutenant. Crabtree was wounded near Morval during the Battle of the Somme in September 1916 and saw further action at Arras and Passchendaele after his recovery. He won a Military Cross for "conspicuous gallantry and devotion to duty" on 26 September 1917. A month later, he was wounded for a second time and did not serve on the Western Front for the remainder of the war. After being promoted to captain, Crabtree was posted briefly to Central Asia before leaving the army.

Career statistics

Honours 
Blackburn Rovers

 Football League First Division: 1913–14

References 

1895 births
People from Clitheroe
English footballers
Blackburn Rovers F.C. players
Association football goalkeepers
English Football League players
British Army personnel of World War I
Preston North End F.C. wartime guest players
Rochdale A.F.C. players
Accrington Stanley F.C. (1891) players
Colne Town F.C. players
Loyal Regiment officers
England amateur international footballers
Recipients of the Military Cross
English football referees
Military personnel from Lancashire
1965 deaths
Loyal Regiment soldiers

People educated at Stonyhurst College